Willy Fritz Grundbacher (5 July 1907 – November 1997) was a Swiss modern pentathlete. He competed at the 1936 Summer Olympics.

References

1907 births
1997 deaths
Swiss male modern pentathletes
Olympic modern pentathletes of Switzerland
Modern pentathletes at the 1936 Summer Olympics